"Kill the Poor" is a song by Dead Kennedys, released in October 1980 on Cherry Red Records as the band's third single, with "In-sight" as its B-side. The song is a scathing satire of the elite who if given the chance, would wipe out the impoverished with a bomb. The title track was re-recorded for the band's first album, Fresh Fruit for Rotting Vegetables (1980), although the single and album versions show little difference in comparison. The B-side of this single is also additionally on the compilation album Give Me Convenience or Give Me Death (1987). A special "disco version" was played and recorded on March 3, 1979 and released on their live album Live at the Deaf Club.

"Kill the Poor" reached #49 in the UK Singles Chart, spending three weeks on the chart.

Charts

Cover versions
 American metalcore band The Agony Scene covered the song for the special edition of their album Get Damned in 2007.
 American heavy metal band Trivium covered the song as part of a series of covers recorded during the recording session of their album The Sin and the Sentence in 2017.
 Russian punk band Pornofilmy covered the song with russian translation named Нищих убивай (lit. 'Kill the poor') for their album Русская мечта. Часть 2 (lit. 'Russian Dream. Part 2') in 2016.
 Dutch composer Maarten Regtien covered the song in the concluding part of his 2nd Trumpet Concerto

See also
Neutron bomb

References

External links
 "[ Kill the Poor"] at Allmusic

Dead Kennedys songs
1980 singles
1980 songs
Songs written by Jello Biafra
Cherry Red Records singles
Satirical songs
Songs about nuclear war and weapons
UK Independent Singles Chart number-one singles